Delaware County, colloquially referred to as Delco, is a county in the Commonwealth of Pennsylvania. With a population of 576,830 as of the 2020 census, it is the fifth-most populous county in Pennsylvania and the third-smallest in area. The county was created on September 26, 1789, from part of Chester County and named for the Delaware River. 

Delaware County is part of the Delaware Valley and borders Philadelphia, the nation's sixth-most populous city, to its northeast. It also is adjacent to the city-county of Philadelphia County and is included in the Philadelphia–Camden–Wilmington, PA–NJ–DE–MD metropolitan statistical area known as the Delaware Valley. Its county seat is Media.

History

Delaware County lies in the river and bay drainage area named "Delaware" in honor of Thomas West, 3rd Baron De La Warr, Governor of the nearby English colony of Virginia.  The land was explored by Henry Hudson in 1609, and over the next several decades it was variously claimed and settled by the Swedes, the Dutch, and the English.  Its original human inhabitants were the Lenape tribe of American Indians.

Once the Dutch were defeated and the extent of New York was determined, King Charles II of England made his grant to William Penn in order to found the colony which came to be named Pennsylvania.  Penn divided his colony into three counties: Bucks, Philadelphia, and Chester.  The riverfront land south of Philadelphia, being the most accessible, was quickly granted and settled.  In 1789, the southeastern portion of Chester County was divided from the rest and named Delaware County for the Delaware River.

Geography

It is the third-smallest county in Pennsylvania by area.

Delaware County is roughly diamond- or kite-shaped, with the four sides formed by the Chester County boundary to the northwest, the boundary with the state of Delaware, a portion of the "Twelve-Mile Circle") to the southwest, the Delaware River, forming the border with the state of New Jersey) to the southeast, and the city of Philadelphia and Montgomery County to the east and northeast.

The lowest point in the state of Pennsylvania is located on the Delaware River in Marcus Hook in Delaware County, where it flows out of Pennsylvania and into Delaware.  The highest point in Delaware County is 500 feet at two points southeast of Wyola in Newtown Township .

Waterways in Delaware County generally flow in a southward direction and ultimately drain into the Delaware River.  The waterways are, from west to east: the Brandywine River (forming a portion of the county's western boundary with Chester County), Naaman's Creek, Stoney Creek, Chester Creek, Ridley Creek, Crum Creek, Muckinipates Creek, Darby Creek and Cobbs Creek (forming a portion of the county's eastern boundary with Philadelphia).  Crum Creek was dammed in 1931 near Pennsylvania Route 252 to fill Springton Lake (also known as Geist Reservoir), an approximately  drinking water reservoir maintained by Aqua America, the county's largest lake.

The Trainer Refinery and the Port of Chester are located along the shores of the Delaware River.

Adjacent counties
Montgomery County, Pennsylvania (north)
Philadelphia County, Pennsylvania (northeast)
Gloucester County, New Jersey (southeast)
New Castle County, Delaware (southwest)
Chester County, Pennsylvania (west)

Delaware County is one of four counties in the United States to border a state with which it shares the same name (the other three are Nevada County, California, Texas County, Oklahoma, and Ohio County, West Virginia).

National protected areas

First State National Historical Park (part)
John Heinz National Wildlife Refuge (part)

State protected area
 of the county are occupied by the Ridley Creek State Park.

Demographics

As of the 2010 census, the county was 71.1% White non-Hispanic, 19.7% Black or African American, 0.2% Native American or Alaskan Native, 4.7% Asian, <0.1% Native Hawaiian, 2.0% were two or more races, and 0.9% were some other race. 3.0% of the population were of Hispanic or Latino ancestry.

As of the 2000 census, there were 550,864 people, 206,320 households, and 139,472 families residing in the county. The racial makeup of the county was 80.3% White, 14.5% African American, 0.1% Native American, 3.3% Asian, <0.1% Pacific Islander, 0.6% from other races, and 1.2% from two or more races.  1.5% of the population were Hispanic or Latino of any race. 24.6% were of Irish, 17.5% Italian, 10.1% German and 6.7% English ancestry.

There were 206,320 households, out of which 31.5% had children under the age of 18 living with them, 50.8% were married couples living together, 12.9% had a female householder with no husband present, and 32.4% were non-families. 27.6% of all households were made up of individuals, and 11.6% had someone living alone who was 65 years of age or older.  The average household size was 2.56 and the average family size was 3.17.

In the county, the population was spread out, with 24.8% under the age of 18, 8.9% from 18 to 24, 28.8% from 25 to 44, 21.9% from 45 to 64, and 15.6% who were 65 years of age or older.  The median age was 37 years. For every 100 females there were 91.2 males.  For every 100 females age 18 and over, there were 86.9 males.

The median income for a household in the county was $50,092, and the median income for a family was $61,590. Males had a median income of $44,155 versus $31,831 for females. The per capita income for the county was $25,040. About 5.8% of families and 8.0% of the population were below the poverty line, including 10.0% of those under age 18 and 7.1% of those age 65 or over.

2020 Census

Communities

Under Pennsylvania law, there are four types of incorporated municipalities: cities, boroughs, townships, and exactly one town. There are 49 municipalities in Delaware County:

City
Chester

Boroughs

 Aldan
 Brookhaven
 Chester Heights
 Clifton Heights
 Collingdale
 Colwyn
 Darby
 East Lansdowne
 Eddystone
 Folcroft
 Glenolden
 Lansdowne
 Marcus Hook
 Media (county seat)
 Millbourne
 Morton
 Norwood
 Parkside
 Prospect Park
 Ridley Park
 Rose Valley
 Rutledge
 Sharon Hill
 Swarthmore
 Trainer
 Upland
 Yeadon

Townships

 Aston
 Bethel
 Chadds Ford
 Chester
 Concord
 Darby
 Edgmont
 Haverford
 Lower Chichester
 Marple
 Middletown
 Nether Providence
 Newtown
 Radnor
 Ridley
 Springfield
 Thornbury
 Tinicum
 Upper Chichester
 Upper Darby
 Upper Providence

Census-designated places
Census-designated places are geographical areas designated by the U.S. Census Bureau for the purposes of compiling demographic data. They are not actual jurisdictions under Pennsylvania law. Other unincorporated communities, such as villages, may be listed here as well.

Ardmore
Boothwyn
Broomall
Cheyney University (mostly in Chester County)
Drexel Hill
Folsom
Haverford College
Lima
Linwood
Village Green-Green Ridge
Woodlyn

Unincorporated communities

Garrett Hill
Glen Mills
Havertown
Radnor
Riddlewood
Rosemont
Secane 
Thornton
Villanova
Wallingford
Wawa
Wayne

Population ranking
The population ranking of the following table is based on the 2010 census of Delaware County.

† county seat

Politics and government

|}

The county has operated under a home-rule charter with five at-large council-members since 1972.

As of November 7, 2022, there are 415,207 registered voters in Delaware County.

Democratic: 207,180 (49.90%)
Republican: 150,527 (36.25%)
Independent: 38,317 (9.23%)
Third Party: 19,183 (4.62%)

Until the 1990s, Delaware County was regarded as a strongly Republican county.  The Delaware County Republican political machine was controlled by William McClure and his son John J. McClure from 1875 to 1965. Delaware County voted for the Republican candidate in nearly every election from 1854 through 1988, one of the two exceptions being Lyndon Johnson's national landslide of 1964. As a measure of how Republican the county was, Franklin Roosevelt was completely shut out in all four of his successful campaigns for president. Even in his 46-state landslide victory of 1936, Roosevelt only got 45 percent of Delaware County's vote.

In 1992, however, the county swung from a 21-point win for George H. W. Bush to a narrow one-point win for Bill Clinton, who became only the second Democrat to win the county in the 20th century. Clinton won it just under 10 points in 1996, coming up just short of a majority. The county has gone Democratic in every Presidential election since then by 10 points or more by progressively-increasing margins.  In the 2004 election Democratic presidential candidate John Kerry won the county by 14 points. Barack Obama won it by large 21-point margins in each of his bids for president. Hillary Clinton carried it by 22 points in 2016. Joe Biden carried it in 2020 with 62 percent of the vote, his second-strongest performance in Pennsylvania. Donald Trump turned in the worst showing for a Republican in the county in over 160 years.

Driving the county's Democratic shift have been longstanding trends in voter registration advantage and demographics. In 1998, Republicans held a voter registration advantage of about 125,000, but by 2008 that advantage had shrunk to under 20,000 voters. As of the November 2021 election, Democrats enjoyed a voter registration advantage of 50,000. Propelling and compounding the voter registration shift has been a change in demographics in the county. Since the 2000 Census, the White population of the county has decreased from 80.3% to 68.5% as of the 2020 Census, while, the Black population has risen from 14.5% to 22.7%, driven by the gentrification of Philadelphia and University City neighborhood and rapid demographic shift in Upper Darby. Further increasing the shift has been the change in education level demographics in the county, as voters have become more college educated and white collar (and, in turn, less blue collar) over the past few decades.

While the longstanding Republican registration edge has been erased, Republicans still remain competitive with Democrats at the state and local level. Most Republicans from the county tend to be fiscally conservative and socially moderate, as is the case with Republicans from most suburban Philadelphia counties. In the 2004 US Senate election, Republican Arlen Specter defeated Joe Hoeffel but Democrat Bob Casey, Jr. defeated Rick Santorum in the 2006 Senate election. All three Democratic state row office candidates carried it in 2008. In 2016, Delaware County elected all Democrats in national office elections except Republican Patrick Meehan (U.S. Representative).

After the election of Donald Trump in 2016, the county rapidly shifted blue as a result of increased Democratic turnout and less enthusiasm from often less conservative suburban Republicans. In the 2019 elections for the Delaware County Council, Democrats swept the board and elected Monica Taylor, Elaine P. Schaefer, and Christine Reuther, gaining control of the county Council for the first time since the Civil War. This was the first time in history that the county had an all-Democratic Council.

As of 2020, all of Delaware County is located in the state's 5th congressional district, represented by Democrat Mary Gay Scanlon. Prior to 2019, most of Delaware County had been in the 7th congressional district. The district had been held for 20 years by Republican Curt Weldon until he was ousted by Joe Sestak, a retired admiral, in the 2006 U.S. House of Representatives election.  Also in the 2006 election, Democrat Bryan Lentz unseated Republican incumbent State Representative Tom Gannon in the 161st House district.  In 2010 Sestak ran for the senate seat vacated by Arlen Specter and was replaced by Republican Pat Meehan, who defeated Lentz, the Democratic candidate.  Lentz was replaced in the State House by Joe Hackett, a Republican.  Meehan represented the 7th district until his resignation on April 27, 2018. Before it was thrown out by a Pennsylvania Supreme Court decision in 2018, the 7th Congressional District had been regarded one of the most irregularly drawn districts in the nation.

Delaware County Council
:

County row officers
Row officers, a term unique to Pennsylvania, are a conglomeration of elected officials defined by Article IX, Section 4 of the Pennsylvania Constitution. This unit of officers includes the position of controller, District Attorney, treasurer, sheriff, register of wills, recorder of deeds, prothonotaries, clerks of the court, and the coroner. It is thought that this term originated because these positions were arranged in a row on a typical ballot.

United States Senate

United States House of Representatives
:

State Senate
:

State House of Representatives
:

Corrections
The George W. Hill Correctional Facility (Delaware County Prison) is located in Thornbury Township. The jail houses pre-trial inmates and convicted persons who are serving sentences of no longer than two years less one day. It is operated by Delaware County.

Education

Public school districts

School districts include:
Chester Upland School District
Chichester School District
Garnet Valley School District
Haverford Township School District
Interboro School District
Marple Newtown School District
Penn-Delco School District
Radnor Township School District
Ridley School District
Rose Tree Media School District
Southeast Delco School District
Springfield School District
Upper Darby School District
Wallingford-Swarthmore School District
West Chester Area School District
William Penn School District

Note that Delaware County Technical High School takes students from all of the county.

Charter schools
Chester Community Charter School
Widener Partnership Charter School
Chester Charter Scholars Academy

Private schools
In 1963 the Roman Catholic Archdiocese of Philadelphia had 48 Catholic K-8/elementary schools in Delaware County with a total of 39,695 students, which was the highest ever enrollment. From 1971 to 2012, 20 of these schools closed, with ten of them closing from 2003 to 2012. By 2012 there were 28 Catholic K-8/elementary schools in Delaware County with a total of 8,291 students. One notable private school is Friends School Haverford.

Colleges and universities

Cabrini University
Cheyney University
Eastern University
Delaware County Community College (locations in Marple Township, Upper Darby and Sharon Hill)
Haverford College
Neumann University
Pendle Hill Quaker Center for Study and Contemplation
Pennsylvania Institute of Technology
Penn State Brandywine
Rosemont College
Swarthmore College
Villanova University
Widener University
Williamson College of the Trades

Adult education
 Haverford Adult School
 Main Line School Night
 Senior Community Services Lifelong Learning
 Delaware County Literacy Council

Libraries

Transportation
Delaware County is bisected north to south by Blue Route Interstate 476, which connects I-76 just north of the extreme northern corner of the county to I-95, which parallels the Delaware River along the southeastern edge of the county.

Delaware County is home to SEPTA's 69th Street Terminal in Upper Darby, and is served by the Norristown High Speed Line (P&W), two Red Arrow trolley lines
(Routes 101 and 102),
four Regional Rail Lines (the Airport Line, Wilmington/Newark Line, Media/Wawa Line, and Paoli/Thorndale Line), and a host of bus routes.

The western portion of Philadelphia International Airport is located in Delaware County, and the county hosts some airport-related commerce such as Philadelphia's UPS terminal and airport hotels.

Major roads and highways

Recreation

Parks

There is one Pennsylvania state park in Delaware County:
Ridley Creek State Park

County parks include:
Clayton Park & Golf Course
Glen Providence Park
Kent Park/Dog Park
Rose Tree Park
Smedley Park
Upland Park

Racing
Harrah's Philadelphia is a harness racing track and casino (i.e., "racino") located on the Chester, Pennsylvania waterfront. It is owned by Vici Properties and operated by Caesars Entertainment.

Sports
The city of Chester is home to the Philadelphia Union of Major League Soccer.  The team plays at Subaru Park, a venue located at the base of the Commodore Barry Bridge.

Delaware County is the traditional home of women's professional soccer in the Philadelphia area.  The former Philadelphia Charge of the defunct Women's United Soccer Association played at Villanova Stadium, which is located on the campus of Villanova University.  The Philadelphia Independence of Women's Professional Soccer succeeded the Charge and played at Widener University's Leslie Quick Stadium in 2011.

Delaware County is the home of one of oldest baseball leagues in the country, the Delco League, which at one time was known for featuring future, former, and even current major league players who were offered more money than their current teams would pay them.

Every summer, Delaware County is home to the Delco Pro-Am, a basketball league consisting of current, future, and former NBA players as well as local standout players.

Delaware County is also the former home of a rugby league team called the Aston Bulls, a member of the American National Rugby League.

Darby was home to the Hilldale Club, the 1925 Colored World Series Champions.

Media
The county itself is serviced by several newspapers, most notably the News of Delaware County, the Delaware County Daily Times, The Suburban and Wayne Times, and The Spirit, the only minority owned newspaper serving Delaware County. The Philadelphia Inquirer also has a significant presence, reflecting Philadelphia's influence on Delaware County and the rest of the metro. Delaware County Magazine is the news magazine with the largest circulation in Delaware County, reaching over 186,000 homes.

Climate
Delaware County has two physical geographic regions: the Piedmont and the Atlantic Coastal Plain, Most of the county has a humid subtropical climate (Cfa) while some higher northern areas have a hot-summer humid continental climate (Dfa.). The hardiness zones are 7a and 7b.

See also

 National Register of Historic Places listings in Delaware County, Pennsylvania

Notes

References

Further reading

External links

 Official website.

 
1789 establishments in Pennsylvania
Populated places established in 1789